This is a list of unmanned aerial vehicles (UAVs, or 'drones'), of China. There are further categories and sub-categories following the main, comprehensive list, and some of the UAVs appear in more than one category/ sub-category when they can be classified by more than one. As late of 2010, there are more than a hundred UAV developers/manufacturers currently in China. By 2014, that number is increased to over two hundred thirty UAV developers / manufacturers in China, with over two-thirds of them are private enterprises (PE), and the remaining are government-owned enterprises. 

Most of the government-owned enterprises are fully capable of indigenously completing the entire development of UAVs of various sizes, from the initial design at the very beginning, all the way to the final completion of UAVs of various sizes, ranging from the smallest micro air vehicle (MAV)s to the largest UAVs. In contrast, most private enterprises lack such capability because they are assemblers purchasing existing commercial off-the-shelf subsystems such as airframes, flight control systems and propulsion systems and integrating these subsystems together into final products of their own. Compounded with transparency and language hurdles, this often creates confusion among observers and analysts outside Chinese because the same UAV appears to be shown by different firms, although the only thing in common is the commercial off-the-shelf airframe chosen by different firms, which choose different airframes for other subsystems when assembling UAVs of their own. Private enterprises with the capability to indigenously complete the entire development of UAVs are often more limited. 

Chinese companies are leaders in the global civilian drone industry and China is the second largest drone market in the world, after the United States. Chinese drone manufacturer DJI alone has 74% of civilian-market share in 2018, with no other company accounting for more than 5%, and with  forecast global sales in 2020. It's followed by Chinese company Yuneec, US company 3D Robotics and French company Parrot with a significant gap in market share. As of 2020, more than 80% of civilian drones are made by Chinese companies.

Full list

Experimental UAVs

For stealth research
This is a list of unmanned experimental UAVs of the People's Republic of China from the main list above, and they are developed to explore the stealth technologies and associated flight control systems, particularly those of flying wing design.

Forward-swept wing design
This is the list of UAVs of Forward-swept wing design of the People's Republic of China from the main list above.

For research on inflatable UAVs
This is a list of unmanned experimental UAVs of the People's Republic of China from the main list above, and they are developed to explore the technologies of inflatable UAVs.

Fuel cell powered UAVs
This is a list of fuel cell powered UAVs of the People's Republic of China from the main list above.

Jet-powered UAVs
This is a list of jet-powered (including rocket-powered) UAVs of the People's Republic of China from the main list above.

Jointed wing UAVs
This is the list of UAVs of jointed wing design of the People's Republic of China from the main list above.

Micro air vehicles
This is a list of unmanned micro air vehicles (MAV) of the People's Republic of China from the main list above. Majority of Chinese fixed- and rotary-wing UAVs are MAVs.

Twin boom UAVs
In addition to conventional layout, twin boom design is the second highest number of layout adopted by Chinese UAVs, and this is the list of UAVs in twin boom design of the People's Republic of China from the main list above.

Twin engine UAVs
This is the list of twin engine UAVs of the People's Republic of China from the main list above.

UAVs controlled by smartphones
This is a list of UAVs of the People's Republic of China controlled by smartphones from the main list above.

Unmanned airships/blimps
This is a list of unmanned blimps and airships of the People's Republic of China from the main list above.

Unmanned helicopters 
This is a list of unmanned helicopters of the People's Republic of China from the main list above, excluding unmanned coaxial helicopters, which are listed separately in their own subcategory. Unmanned helicopters consist of a significant portion of Chinese UAVs and most of these Chinese unmanned helicopters are developed as a direct result of an incident in 2007, when Japanese government arrested three officials of Yamaha Motor Company in early 2007 for exporting nine Yamaha unmanned helicopters to China in 2005, allegedly could be converted to military application from its original crop dusting role. This alleged charge is denied by both Yamaha and China, and Yahama has claimed that these unmanned helicopters only have a range of only 200 meters, or 656 feet, from the person who is controlling them and are therefore unlikely to be used to carry weapons of mass destruction, but the Japanese government nonetheless pressed charges. The action of Japanese government triggered a massive Chinese response in a nationwide effort to develop domestic Chinese unmanned helicopters to replace those imported from Japan, including the rapid acceleration of existing unmanned helicopters programs in China. The massive nationwide effort has resulted in more than a hundred domestic Chinese unmanned helicopters, most of which are completed by integrating existing commercial off-the-shelf airframes with autopilots and flight control systems. Eventually these Chinese unmanned helicopters evolved into models with all subsystems such airframe and flight control systems indigenously developed in China.

Unmanned multirotors

Unmanned quadcopters
This is a list of unmanned quadcopters of the People's Republic of China from the main list above.

Unmanned hexacopters
This is a list of unmanned hexacopters of the People's Republic of China from the main list above.

Unmanned octocopters
This is a list of unmanned octocopters of the People's Republic of China from the main list above.

V/STOL UAVs
This is a list of V/STOL UAVs of the People's Republic of China from the main list above.

Tiltrotor V/STOL UAVs
This is a list of tiltrotor V/STOL UAVs of the People's Republic of China from the main list above.

See also 
 List of Chinese aircraft
 List of Chinese aircraft engines
 List of unmanned aerial vehicles

References

 
Chinese aviation-related lists
Robotics lists
Lists of aircraft by design configuration
Chinese military-related lists